Guido di Tella (June 12, 1931 – December 31, 2001) was an Argentine businessman, academic and diplomat who served as Minister of Foreign Affairs.

Life and times
Guido José Mario Di Tella was born in Buenos Aires, 1931. His father, Torcuato di Tella, was an Italian Argentine immigrant who had become a prominent local industrialist, producing industrial machinery and home appliances through the Siam di Tella establishment.

Early career
Guido lost his father at age 17, and per his wishes, the young man pursued an  engineering degree at the University of Buenos Aires with the intention of later managing the family industrial firm (an employer of 5,000). He also took an interest in politics, becoming a co-founder of the Christian Democratic Party of Argentina in 1954. Graduating in 1955, he was accepted into the Massachusetts Institute of Technology (MIT), where he earned a PhD in Economics in 1959. He married Nelly Ruvira, and they had five children.

Returning to Argentina he co-founded -with his older brother Torcuato- the Torcuato di Tella Institute, an educational and cultural foundation; by then, Guido Di Tella had become a vocal Peronist (a supporter of the exiled, populist former President Juan Perón). Such a progression was unusual among young Argentines of a privileged background; Di Tella, however, came to believe that class-driven prejudices against the mostly working-class Peronists had to be set aside if Argentina was once again, in his words, to become a "serious country." Teaching at his alma mater and at the Argentine Catholic University, he also helped spur the Di Tella Institute into becoming a leading sponsor of the local vanguard movement in the arts during the 1960s. His ongoing support of Perón led to his brief expulsion from Argentina in the early 1970s, when he was made a visiting fellow of St. Antony's College, Oxford University.

Di Tella had been among Perón's entourage on the aging leader's brief, November 1972 visit that had been authorized ahead of the 1973 general elections. Following Perón's July 1974 death, his widow and successor Isabel Perón named him Deputy Economy Minister, a post he held until the March 1976 coup against her chaotic presidency. Di Tella then spent many years of exile in Oxford, where he wrote a book about his experiences. Returning to Argentina in 1989, he never severed his links with the city and university, keeping a house there and visiting every spring.

Foreign Minister
Peronist Carlos Menem, elected President of Argentina in 1989, returned di Tella to the post of Deputy Economy Minister under Miguel Roig, and following the elderly Roig's death days later he was appointed Ambassador to the United States. A cabinet shake-up in February 1991 resulted in his succeeding Domingo Cavallo as Foreign Minister. Cavallo was named Economy Minister, and had already initiated Argentina's rapprochement with the United Kingdom and United States; diplomatic relations with the UK had been resumed in February 1990, and Argentina had participated in the Gulf War.

However, Argentina also had a long tradition of voting against the U.S. at the United Nations, and for years was an active member of the Non-aligned Movement. Di Tella carried out Menem's realignment of Argentine foreign policy towards the "Washington Consensus," outlining a new U.S.-Argentine entente the Foreign Minister famously described as "carnal relations."  Di Tella's efforts also led to a 1997 decision by U.S. President Bill Clinton to designate Argentina a Major non-NATO ally.

He also strengthened the newly cordial relations with the U.K. and signed landmark commercial cooperation accords regarding the Exclusive Economic Zone around the Falkland Islands with British Foreign Secretary Douglas Hurd, in November 1991.  A charm offensive towards residents of the Falklands (including Di Tella's personally-autographed annual postcards) remained largely fruitless - though it resulted in an improved opinion of Argentina by the islanders, who credited him with being the first Argentine politician to recognise that any solution to the problem must involve consultations with the islanders themselves.

Later life
Di Tella retired from public service with the change of administrations in December 1999, on which occasion he was made an honorary fellow of St. Antony's (a rare distinction). He visited the Falkland Islands as an ordinary citizen (a concession he had obtained for Argentine nationals while Foreign Minister), in October 2000, and was warmly received.

Illness forced Di Tella to retire from politics, however, and 2001 was marked by an investigation into his possible role in the illegal, Menem-era sale of arms to Croatia and Ecuador (each embroiled in wars, at the time); he maintained his innocence, and was eventually spared further trial because of his ill health. Secluded in his estancia outside Navarro, Buenos Aires, Di Tella suffered a stroke on New Year's Eve, 2001, dying at age 70. He was survived by his widow, Nelly, and his five children.

References

1931 births
2001 deaths
People from Buenos Aires
Argentine people of Italian descent
University of Buenos Aires alumni
Academic staff of the University of Buenos Aires
Fellows of St Antony's College, Oxford
MIT Sloan School of Management alumni
Ambassadors of Argentina to the United States
Foreign ministers of Argentina
Burials at La Chacarita Cemetery
Argentine philanthropists
Defense ministers of Argentina
20th-century philanthropists